Megalodonta is a genus of flowering plants in the daisy family.

Asteraceae genera
Coreopsideae